Yanko Rusev (born 1 December 1958) is a former Olympic weightlifter for Bulgaria.

In 1993 he was elected member of the International Weightlifting Federation Hall of Fame. He was named the 1981 Athlete of the Year for Bulgaria. In 2019 he was awarded the highest state award of Bulgaria in the field of sport - the Wreath of the winner.

Early life
He was born on December 1, 1958 in Ivanski, Shumen. At 15, he attempted to enter the sport school "Olympian Hopes" in Sofia, but was turned down on the grounds that he was a "hopeless" weightlifter.

Training
Rusev first began training for soccer and wrestling. Afterwards, he took an interest in weightlifting. During his education at 19, Ivan Abadzhiev noticed him, and soon Rusev was weightlifting in the world games at Stuttgart, and won a silver medal.

Weightlifting achievements
Olympic champion (1980 - 67,5 kg);
Five-time senior world champion (1978, 79 and 80 - 67,5 kg, 81 and 1982 – 75 kg);
Twice silver medalist in Senior World Championships (1977 – 60 kg and 1983 - 67,5 kg);
Five-time senior European champion (1978, 79, 80 - 67,5 kg 81 and 1982 75 kg);
Twice silver medalist in Senior European Championships (1977 – 60 kg and 1983 - 67,5 kg);
Set 36 world records during his career.

World Records by Yanko Rusev
9/19/1977 Clean and Jerk 165 Featherweight Stuttgart 
7/18/1978 Clean and Jerk 179 Lightweight Athens 
10/5/1978 Clean and Jerk 180 Lightweight Gettysburg 
5/22/1979 Snatch 145 Lightweight Varna 
5/22/1979 Snatch 146 Lightweight Varna 
5/22/1979 Clean and Jerk 181.5 Lightweight Varna 
7/9/1979 Snatch 147 Lightweight Sofia 
7/9/1979 Clean and Jerk 185.5 Lightweight Sofia 
7/9/1979 Total (2)  325 Lightweight Sofia 
11/6/1979 Clean and Jerk 187.5 Lightweight Saloniki 
11/6/1979 Total (2)  332.5 Lightweight Saloniki 
2/1/1980 Snatch 147.5 Lightweight Varna 
2/1/1980 Clean and Jerk 188 Lightweight Varna 
2/1/1980 Total (2)  335 Lightweight Varna 
4/28/1980 Snatch 148 Lightweight Beograd 
4/28/1980 Clean and Jerk 190 Lightweight Beograd 
4/28/1980 Total (2)  337.5 Lightweight Beograd 
7/23/1980 Clean and Jerk 195 Lightweight Moscow 
7/23/1980 Total (2)  342.5 Lightweight Moscow 
9/16/1981 Clean and Jerk 206 Middleweight Lille 
4/8/1982 Clean and Jerk 206.5 Middleweight Varna 
9/2/1982 Total (2)  365 Middleweight Ljubljana 
9/22/1982 Clean and Jerk 208 Middleweight Ljubljana 
9/22/1982 Clean and Jerk 209 Middleweight Ljubljana 
9/22/1982 Total (2)  362.5 Middleweight Ljubljana

References

External links
 
 

1958 births
Living people
Bulgarian male weightlifters
Olympic weightlifters of Bulgaria
Weightlifters at the 1980 Summer Olympics
Olympic gold medalists for Bulgaria
Olympic medalists in weightlifting
People from Shumen
Medalists at the 1980 Summer Olympics
World record setters in weightlifting
European Weightlifting Championships medalists
World Weightlifting Championships medalists
20th-century Bulgarian people